MarketWatch is a website that provides financial information, business news, analysis, and stock market data. Along with The Wall Street Journal and Barron's, it is a subsidiary of Dow Jones & Company, a property of News Corp.

History
The company was conceived as DBC Online by Data Broadcasting Corp. in the fall of 1995. The marketwatch.com domain name was registered on July 30, 1997. The website launched on October 30, 1997, as a 50/50 joint venture between DBC and CBS News run by Larry Kramer and with Thom Calandra as editor-in-chief.

In 1999, the company hired David Callaway and in 2003, Callaway became editor-in-chief. In January 1999, during the dot-com bubble, the company became a public company via an initial public offering. After pricing at $17 per share, the stock traded as high as $130 per share on its first day of trading, giving it a market capitalization of over $1 billion despite only $7 million in annual revenues. In June 2000, the company formed a joint venture with the Financial Times with Peter Bale as managing editor.
 
In January 2004, Calandra resigned amidst allegations of insider trading. In January 2005, Dow Jones & Company acquired the company for $528 million, or $18 per share.

In May 2016, MarketWatch hired Dan Shar as general manager In October 2020, MarketWatch announced that it would become a paywalled subscription-based publication, in order to "raise the ambitions of our journalism". Mark DeCambre was named editor in chief on March 21, 2022.

See also
 List of assets owned by News Corp

References

External links
 

1999 initial public offerings
2005 mergers and acquisitions
Dot-com bubble
Dow Jones & Company
Economics websites
Internet properties established in 1997
Mass media companies of the United States